The 2012 Boston Red Sox season was the 112th season in the franchise's Major League Baseball history. The Red Sox finished last in the five-team American League East with a record of 69 wins and 93 losses, 26 games behind the first-place New York Yankees. It was the first time the Red Sox finished last in their division since 1992. Under manager Bobby Valentine, the Red Sox finished with the third-lowest winning percentage in the American League.

On the heels of a 2011 season that ended with the team losing 20 of 27 games during September, resulting in their elimination from playoff contention and the departure of manager Terry Francona, the Red Sox struggled throughout their 2012 campaign under new manager Bobby Valentine. At the All-Star break the team was 43–43, and at the end of August they had fallen to 62–71. At 66–81 on September 16, the Red Sox were mathematically eliminated from the playoff race. On September 19, the team lost their 82nd regular season game, thus clinching their first losing season since 1997. On September 30, the Red Sox reached the 90-loss mark, assuring them of their first season with 90 or more losses since 1966. The next day, the team suffered their 91st loss of the season, to the arch-rival Yankees, the most defeats since their 100-loss season in 1965. On October 4, a day after their final game of the season, Valentine was fired, with one year and two option years still remaining on his contract.

Offseason

November
Jonathan Papelbon, the closer of the Red Sox for seven seasons (2005–2011), signed a 4-year, $50 million deal with the Philadelphia Phillies.
On November 29, 2011, Bobby Valentine accepted the Red Sox offer to become their new manager for the 2012 season.

December
On December 13, 2011, the Red Sox signed catcher Kelly Shoppach to a 1-year, $1.35 million contract.
On December 14, 2011, the Red Sox signed infielder Nick Punto to a 2-year contract.
Also on December 14, 2011, the Red Sox traded right-handed pitcher Kyle Weiland and shortstop Jed Lowrie to the Houston Astros, in exchange for right-handed pitcher Mark Melancon.
On December 28, 2011, the Red Sox traded right-handed pitcher Raul Alcantara, first baseman Miles Head, and right fielder Josh Reddick to the Oakland Athletics for right-handed pitcher Andrew Bailey and right fielder Ryan Sweeney.

January

On January 9, 2012, the Red Sox signed starting pitcher Aaron Cook.
On January 16, 2012, the Red Sox signed another pitcher, Vicente Padilla.
On January 21, 2012, the Red Sox sent infielder Marco Scutaro to the Colorado Rockies in exchange for pitcher Clayton Mortensen.
On January 23, 2012, the Red Sox agreed to sign outfielder Cody Ross to a 1-year, $3 million deal plus incentives.

Spring training
The Red Sox began spring training play at the new JetBlue Park in Fort Myers, Florida, replacing City of Palms Park as their home field for spring training.

Regular season

Opening Day

The Red Sox opened their 2012 season on April 5, 2012, against the Detroit Tigers. Tigers closer José Valverde recorded his first blown save since September 2, 2010, allowing the Red Sox to tie the game in the 9th inning, but the Tigers won, 3–2, on a game-winning single by Austin Jackson.

Opening Day lineup

April
After new closer Andrew Bailey injured his thumb days before Opening Day, the Red Sox went 1–5 over their first six games before mercifully hitting a three-game winning streak, resulting in a second consecutive undesirable start for the Red Sox after going 0–6 over their first six games in 2011.  Center fielder Jacoby Ellsbury was placed on the 15-day disabled list after a shoulder injury during the home opener on April 13.

During an interview aired on local television on April 15, manager Bobby Valentine ripped 3B Kevin Youkilis, saying he is not "as physically or emotionally into the game as he has been in the past". After outspoken defense of Youkilis by teammates Dustin Pedroia and Adrián González, Valentine turned on his own words, saying he "was totally behind him". After Valentine's comments, the Red Sox plunged into a 5-game losing streak.

On April 20, the Red Sox celebrated 100 years at Fenway Park prior to the game against the New York Yankees with introductions of around 200 former Red Sox players, managers and coaches. Both teams wore throwback uniforms during the game similar to those used in the first major league game at Fenway Park. The Red Sox had off-white uniforms and caps, with only the words "Red Sox" in red across the chest. The Yankees' uniforms were all grey with the only printing the letters "NY" on the caps and left breast. After losing 4 consecutive games, the Red Sox took a 9–0 lead through 5 innings against the rival Yankees on April 21, but relief pitchers Vicente Padilla, Matt Albers, Franklin Morales, Alfredo Aceves, Justin Thomas, and Junichi Tazawa combined to allow 14 runs total in the 7th and 8th innings, as the Yankees prevailed by a score of 15–9, for the Red Sox' 5th consecutive loss. After the game, the Red Sox traded pitcher Michael Bowden to the Chicago Cubs for outfielder Marlon Byrd to help out their outfield after the injuries to Carl Crawford before the season and Ellsbury earlier in the season.

After their losing streak, the road was kind to the Red Sox, as they amassed a six-game winning streak by sweeping the Minnesota Twins in Minneapolis and taking the first three games of a four-game series against the Chicago White Sox, including scoring 9 runs in 5 innings against Philip Humber, who had thrown a perfect game in his previous start.  In the end, the Red Sox closed out April with an 11–11 record.

May
The second month of the season did not start well for the Red Sox, as they went winless over their first five games in May.  The Red Sox dropped the latter two games of a three-game series against the Oakland A's and were swept by the Baltimore Orioles in a three-game series that featured both 13- and  17-inning romps.  On May 6, the Red Sox used all of their available bullpen pitchers in the lengthy 17-inning game and had to send in outfielder Darnell McDonald to pitch, ultimately leading to a 9–6 setback. On a lighter note, however, rookie third baseman Will Middlebrooks hit a grand slam in that game for his first Major League home run, and would then hit 2 home runs in the Red Sox' next game, which they won to snap their losing streak.

The Red Sox finally saw some measurable success at Fenway over and just after Mothers' Day weekend, taking three games of four from the Cleveland Indians and sweeping a quick two-game series over the Seattle Mariners before embarking on another road trip. During this time, McDonald went on the Disabled List, but the Red Sox recalled OF Daniel Nava and acquired OF Scott Podsednik, who had not played a Major League game since September 9, 2010. Podsednik was initially assigned to AAA Pawtucket for the time being. On this road trip, the Red Sox went 5–3, including taking 2 out of 3 games against the Philadelphia Phillies in their first interleague series of the year and 2 out of 3 games against the division-leading Orioles. Closer Alfredo Aceves had 4 saves in the 8-game road trip. While on the road trip, outfielders Cody Ross and Ryan Sweeney were injured, but 3B Kevin Youkilis returned from the Disabled List. With Middlebrooks settled into starting at third base, the Red Sox used Youkilis at first base with Adrián González playing right field. Podsednik and Che-Hsuan Lin were promoted from the minor leagues to help out in the injury-torn outfield.

On May 26, Jarrod Saltalamacchia had a pinch-hit, two-run home run off Fernando Rodney with one out in the bottom of the ninth inning, to lift the Red Sox to a 3–2 win over the Tampa Bay Rays at Fenway Park. It was the first walk-off home run of Saltalamacchia's career, while Rodney suffered the first blown save of the season after opening the year with a perfect 15-for-15 in save opportunities.

On May 29, the Red Sox cruised to a 6–3 win over pitcher Justin Verlander and the Detroit Tigers to achieve a record of 25–24, their first winning record of the season.

June
The Red Sox entered June having finally amassed a winning record, but they soon found themselves struggling to keep it afloat.  The Sox peaked at 28–25 on June 2, before slipping into a three-game setback.  The Red Sox took 2 of 3 from the Toronto Blue Jays but only salvaged one game of a three-game series against the Baltimore Orioles.

With a short period of divisional play now through, the Red Sox commenced with interleague play, facing off against the Washington Nationals, only to be swept by the Nats in the weekend series and yet again shoved below the .500 winning-percentage mark.  Then, the Sox proceeded to try to rack up wins on the road over a six-game road voyage.  They challenged the Miami Marlins, winning two of three games while visiting the new Marlins Park in Miami for the first time, and then proceeded to also take two of three games from the Chicago Cubs at Wrigley Field.  Back at Fenway, starting pitcher Clay Buchholz continued his domination against Miami at Fenway on June 19, racking his 8th win of the season.  On June 24, the Red Sox cruised to a 9–4 victory against Atlanta at Fenway in what was to become Kevin Youkilis' last game with the Red Sox before being traded to the Chicago White Sox.  Fans, aware of the trade rumors, gave Youkilis a standing ovation after he hit a triple during the game.  The Red Sox received utility player Brent Lillibridge and pitcher Zach Stewart (who was assigned to AAA Pawtucket) in the trade.  On June 24, 2012, the Red Sox completed interleague play for the 2012 regular season. They finished off their homestand by welcoming the Blue Jays to Fenway and winning two of three games against them.

To finish off June, the Red Sox set out on a seven-game western road swing beginning with the first three games of a four-game series against the Seattle Mariners at Safeco Field in Seattle, having amassed a 1–2 record in the series before entering July.

July
The BoSox opened the month of July by ending the four-game Seattle series with a victory on July 1.  The club traveled down the coast to Oakland, where they were swept by the Athletics in a 3-game series from July 2–4.  Although they often have an afternoon home game on the Fourth of July, the Red Sox remained on the road during the holiday this season.

The Sox came home to Fenway Park to face the rival Yankees in a four-game series, which included a Saturday doubleheader created to compensate for a rained out Red Sox-Yankees game earlier in the year.  The Red Sox lost 3 of 4 games against New York, dropping the Friday, Saturday afternoon, and Sunday games, and being victorious only in the Saturday night game.  One bright spot for the Red Sox over the weekend was the surprising breakout performance of Pedro Ciriaco, making his debut with the Red Sox.  Ciriaco amassed four hits and four RBIs in the Saturday night game, as his offensive prowess became the main storyline of the Red Sox' lone win of the series.

Boston headed into the All-Star Break at exactly .500, harboring a 43–43 record.  They had gone 2–6 thus far in the month of July by that time.

In their first week after the All-Star Break, things began to pick up for the Red Sox, as they took 2 of 3 from the Rays at Tropicana Field.  Returning home, the Red Sox faced a four-game series against the Chicago White Sox, the team to which fan favorite Kevin Youkilis had been traded from the Red Sox less than a month prior.  Youkilis received a standing ovation in his first at bat returning to Fenway Park, and continued to receive strong applause and "Youk" calls as the series went on.  Cody Ross exploded in this series, slamming two three-run home runs on July 18 against Chicago and again crushing another three-run, walk-off home run in the bottom of the ninth on July 19, vaulting the BoSox from a 1–0 deficit to a 3–1 victory.  The Red Sox enjoyed this offensive prowess in spite of the loss of big hitter David Ortiz to the 15-day disabled list after injuring himself during a slide.  Mauro Gómez took his place as designated hitter during his absence.

The Red Sox soon hit another bump in the road, however, getting swept in a vital intra-divisional series with Toronto, then proceeding to lose two of three to the Rangers.  The Sox fell as low as 49–51 but were able to close out July with a strong surge, salvaging the Saturday and Sunday games of a weekend series against the Yankees in the Bronx after losing the Friday contest, and then winning the first two games of a three-game home series against Detroit, such that the BoSox were able to close out July on a four-game winning streak.  The Sox went 12–14 in July, making it their worst month of the season thus far, but the club remained above .500 at 53–51.

August

The Red Sox fell into a rut yet again as they entered the season's fifth month.  They opened August with four consecutive losses and by August 9 they came out victorious in only two of their last nine matchups.  Beginning on August 10, the Sox began a pattern of alternating wins and losses.  As of August 14, the Sox' record stood at a measly 57–60.

The club as a whole was jolted by the death of Red Sox legend Johnny Pesky on Monday, August 13, 2012, at the age of 92, in hospice care in the nearby North Shore suburb of Danvers.  To honor Johnny's memory, the team added a black armband to the right sleeve of their road uniform, as well as added a black patch with a white no. 6 to their home uniform. Oddly, David Ortiz, Clay Buchholz, Vicente Padilla, and Jarrod Saltalamacchia were the only Red Sox players who attended Pesky's funeral, only for most of the team to appear at a bowling event led by pitcher Josh Beckett later that night, which angered fans, press, and front office executives alike.

On August 16, Buchholz pitched the second immaculate inning in franchise history, striking out all three Baltimore Orioles batters on a total of nine pitches in the sixth inning. After consecutive losses to the Orioles, the Sox recommenced their pattern of alternating wins and losses and traveled to Yankee Stadium for the second time in less than a month to take on the Bronx Bombers in a weekend series, which they lost, surrendering the Friday and Sunday games and salvaging only the Saturday contest.

Returning home, the Sox were swept by the Angels and ended a losing streak at four games by triumphing over Kansas City.  With playoff hopes looking dim, Red Sox office management decided to look ahead to the following season by freeing up money in the payroll by performing a salary dump trade that sent Adrián González, Josh Beckett, Carl Crawford, and Nick Punto to the Dodgers in exchange for James Loney and four prospects: pitchers Allen Webster and Rubby De La Rosa, infielder Ivan De Jesus Jr., and outfielder Jerry Sands.  The trade was finalized on August 25, 2012.

The Red Sox took three of four from Kansas City but relapsed into another large rut as they commenced a West Coast road trip by being swept by the Angels (since the Angels also won all three of their games at Fenway Park against the Sox a week earlier, the Angels completely swept the season series against Boston, 6 games to 0) and losing extravagantly to the Oakland Athletics on Friday, August 31, by a score of 20–2; the game was the worst loss for the Red Sox in 12 years, as former Red Sox Brandon Moss, George Kottaras, and Josh Reddick hit home runs against their former team.  The Red Sox finished off an extremely shoddy August with a 9–20 record, only two wins more and the same number of losses as the Sox' infamous 7–20 record in their collapse of September 2011.

September and October
The Red Sox opened September in the middle of a weekend series against Oakland, losing their first game in September, 7–1, and losing again the following day by a score of 6–2, giving Oakland the sweep.  The Athletics had previously swept the Red Sox in 2012 in July.  On Labor Day, the Red Sox opened up a three-game swing in Seattle with yet another loss, bringing their losing streak to a season-worst seven games.  The Red Sox came out of the spiral with a 4–3 win against Seattle on Tuesday, September 4, but the extreme damage of the losing streak and of the Sox' August 9–20 to the team's playoff hopes had already been done.  The Red Sox slipped into last place in the American League East shortly afterward after being swept by the Toronto Blue Jays in a weekend series, allowing the Jays to hop over the Red Sox up to fourth place.  Boston broke yet another losing streak with a bottom-ninth victory over the rival Yankees on Tuesday, September 11, in a game wherein Jacoby Ellsbury recorded a walk-off single for the 4–3 triumph.

Heading into a weekend series in Toronto, the Sox found some success, winning the three-game series by taking the first two games on Friday, September 14 and Saturday, September 15, resulting in the first consecutive victories for the BoSox since August 26–27.  However, the very next day, on Sunday, September 16, the Sox fell to the Jays to put their record at 66–81, officially eliminating them, albeit unsurprisingly, from the playoff race for the third straight year.

On Wednesday, September 19, the Tampa Bay Rays defeated the Red Sox, 13–3 at Tropicana Field in St. Petersburg.  As a result, the Red Sox are assured of their first losing season since 1997, when they went 78–84.

The Red Sox closed out home play with a five-game homestand at Fenway, losing four of those five games.  Their last home victory of the year was a 2–1 decision against the Orioles on Sunday, September 23.  Fenway hosted its final MLB game until 2013 on Wednesday, September 26, a 4–2 setback to Tampa Bay.

Embarking on a six-game road trip to close out their season, the Red Sox secured their first 90-loss season since 1966 with a loss to Baltimore on Sunday, September 30.

The Red Sox faced their archrival Yankees in the final series of the season and, fittingly, lost all three games, two of them by blowout scores of 10–2 and 14–2, and one in an extra-inning heartbreaker by a score of 4–3 after 12 innings.

Their final few weeks of the 2012 season poignantly summed up the season as a whole: the Red Sox ended the season with their eighth straight loss, and lost 12 of 13 to finish out the club's most disastrous season since the 1990s.

The 2012 season for the Red Sox was marred by injuries to key players, inconsistent play, massive unloading of players with large contracts, turmoil, and clubhouse drama featured by feuds between manager Bobby Valentine and players, feuds between Valentine and the coaching staff, and Valentine's persistent run-ins with the media.

Firing of Bobby Valentine and Aftermath
On the final day of the season, it was announced that the Red Sox have plans to fire Bobby Valentine from his position as manager after this one season with him as manager of the club, according to "people familiar with the situation", as quoted from a CBS report on the issue.

On Thursday, October 4, 2012, Valentine was officially fired from the position of manager of the Boston Red Sox after one season, confirming the earlier rumors. He was replaced with Toronto Blue Jays manager John Farrell on Saturday, October 20, 2012. The Red Sox proceeded to vault back into first place the following season, winning the 2013 World Series.

2012 Roster

Game log

|-  style="text-align:center; background-color:#ffbbbb"
| 1 || April 5 || @ Tigers || 2–3 || Valverde (1–0) || Melancon (0–1) ||  || Comerica Park || 45,027 || 0–1 || L1
|-  style="text-align:center; background-color:#ffbbbb"
| 2 || April 7 || @ Tigers || 0–10 || Below (1–0) || Beckett (0–1) ||  || Comerica Park || 44,710 || 0–2 || L2
|-  style="text-align:center; background-color:#ffbbbb"
| 3 || April 8 || @ Tigers || 12–13 (11) || Below (2–0) || Melancon (0–2) ||  || Comerica Park || 30,788 || 0–3 ||  L3
|-  style="text-align:center; background-color:#bbffbb"
| 4 || April 9 || @ Blue Jays || 4–2 || Atchison (1–0) || Santos (0–1) || Aceves (1) || Rogers Centre || 48,473 || 1–3 || W1
|-  style="text-align:center; background-color:#ffbbbb"
| 5 || April 10 || @ Blue Jays || 3–7 || Drabek (1–0) || Bard (0–1) ||  || Rogers Centre || 26,351 || 1–4 || L1
|-  style="text-align:center; background-color:#ffbbbb"
| 6 || April 11 || @ Blue Jays || 1–3 || Romero (1–0) || Lester (0–1) || Santos (1)|| Rogers Centre || 25,285 || 1–5 || L2 
|-  style="text-align:center; background:#bbffbb"
| 7 || April 13 || Rays || 12–2 || Beckett (1–1) || Price (1–1) ||  || Fenway Park || 37,032 || 2–5 || W1
|-  style="text-align:center; background:#bbffbb"
| 8 || April 14 || Rays || 13–5 || Buchholz (1–0) || Badenhop (0–1) ||  || Fenway Park || 38,024 || 3–5 || W2
|-  style="text-align:center; background:#bbffbb"
| 9 || April 15 || Rays || 6–4 || Padilla (1–0) || Moore (0–1) || Aceves (2) || Fenway Park || 38,024 || 4–5 || W3 
|-  style="text-align:center; background-color:#ffbbbb"
| 10 || April 16 || Rays || 0–1 || Shields (2–0) || Bard (0–2) ||  Rodney (4) || Fenway Park || 38,108 || 4–6 || L1
|-  style="text-align:center; background-color:#ffbbbb"
| 11 || April 17 || Rangers || 3–18 || Lewis (2–0) || Lester (0–2) ||  || Fenway Park || 38,229 || 4–7 || L2
|-  style="text-align:center; background-color:#ffbbbb"
| 12 || April 18 || Rangers || 3–6 || Holland (2–0) || Beckett (1–2) ||  || Fenway Park || 37,967 || 4–8 || L3
|-  style="text-align:center; background-color:#ffbbbb"
| 13 || April 20 || Yankees || 2–6 || Nova (3–0) || Buchholz (1–1) ||  || Fenway Park || 36,770 || 4–9 || L4
|-  style="text-align:center; background-color:#ffbbbb"
| 14 || April 21 || Yankees || 9–15 || Soriano (2–0) || Aceves (0–1) ||  || Fenway Park || 37,839 || 4–10 || L5
|-  style="text-align:center; background:#bbbbbb"
|    || April 22 || Yankees ||colspan=8|Postponed (rain) Rescheduled for July 7 as part of a double-header 
|-  style="text-align:center; background-color:#bbffbb"
| 15 || April 23 || @ Twins || 6–5 || Bard (1–2) || Capps (0–1) || Aceves (3) || Target Field || 32,351 || 5–10 || W1
|-  style="text-align:center; background-color:#bbffbb"
| 16 || April 24 || @ Twins || 11–2 || Beckett (2–2) || Blackburn (0–2) ||  || Target Field || 33,651 || 6–10 || W2
|-  style="text-align:center; background-color:#bbffbb"
| 17 || April 25 || @ Twins || 7–6 || Buchholz (1–2) || Hendriks (0–1) || Aceves (4) || Target Field || 32,254 || 7–10 || W3
|-  style="text-align:center; background-color:#bbffbb"
| 18 || April 26 || @ White Sox || 10–3 || Doubront (1–0) || Humber (1–1) || Tazawa (1) || U.S. Cellular Field || 20,266 || 8–10 || W4
|-  style="text-align:center; background-color:#bbffbb"
| 19 || April 27 || @ White Sox || 10–3 || Bard (2–2)  || Danks (2–3)  ||  || U.S. Cellular Field || 20,414  || 9–10 || W5
|-  style="text-align:center; background-color:#bbffbb"
| 20 || April 28 || @ White Sox || 1–0 || Lester (1–2) || Peavy (3–1) || Aceves (5) || U.S. Cellular Field || 20,057 || 10–10 || W6
|-  style="text-align:center; background-color:#ffbbbb"
| 21 || April 29 || @ White Sox || 1–4 || Floyd (2–3) || Beckett (2–3) || Thornton (1)  || U.S. Cellular Field || 22,811 || 10–11 || L1
|-  style="text-align:center; background-color:#bbffbb"
| 22 || April 30 || Athletics || 11–6 || Buchholz (3–1) || Milone (3–2) ||  || Fenway Park || 37,359 || 11–11 || W1 
|-

|-  style="text-align:center; background-color:#ffbbbb"
| 23 || May 1 || Athletics || 3–5 || Parker (1–0) || Doubront (1–1) || Norberto (1) || Fenway Park || 37,225 || 11–12 || L1
|-  style="text-align:center; background-color:#ffbbbb"
| 24 || May 2 || Athletics || 2–4 || McCarthy (2–3) || Bard (2–3) || Fuentes (1) || Fenway Park || 37,434 || 11–13 || L2
|-  style="text-align:center; background-color:#ffbbbb"
| 25 || May 4 || Orioles || 4–6 (13) || Patton (1–0) || Morales (0–1) || Johnson (8) || Fenway Park || 37,223 || 11–14 || L3 
|-  style="text-align:center; background-color:#ffbbbb"
| 26 || May 5 || Orioles || 2–8 || Hammel (4–1) || Cook (0–1)  ||  || Fenway Park || 37,581 || 11–15 || L4 
|-  style="text-align:center; background-color:#ffbbbb"
| 27 || May 6 || Orioles || 6–9 (17) || Davis (1–0) || McDonald (0–1) ||  || Fenway Park || 37,394 || 11–16 || L5
|-  style="text-align:center; background-color:#bbffbb"
| 28 || May 7 || @ Royals || 11–5 || Doubront (2–1) || Sánchez (1–2) || Padilla (1) || Kauffman Stadium || 19,502 || 12–16 || W1
|-  style="text-align:center; background-color:#ffbbbb"
| 29 || May 8 || @ Royals || 4–6 || Mijares (2–1) || Bard (2–4) || Broxton (6) || Kauffman Stadium || 20,524 || 12–17 || L1
|-  style="text-align:center; background-color:#ffbbbb"
| 30 || May 9 || @ Royals || 3–4 || Chen (1–4) || Lester (1–3) || Broxton (7) || Kauffman Stadium || 18,339 || 12–18 || L2 
|-  style="text-align:center; background-color:#ffbbbb"
| 31 || May 10 || Indians || 3–8 || Lowe (5–1) || Beckett (2–4) ||  || Fenway Park || 37,348 || 12–19 || L3
|-  style="text-align:center; background-color:#bbffbb"
| 32 || May 11 || Indians || 7–5 || Buchholz (4–1) || Jiménez (3–3) || Aceves (6) || Fenway Park || 37,438 || 13–19 || W1
|-  style="text-align:center; background-color:#bbffbb"
| 33 || May 12 || Indians || 4–1 || Doubront (3–1) || McAllister (1–1) || Aceves (7) || Fenway Park || 38,048 || 14–19 || W2
|-  style="text-align:center; background-color:#bbffbb"
| 34 || May 13 || Indians || 12–1 || Bard (3–4) || Masterson (1–2) ||  || Fenway Park || 37,611 || 15–19 || W3
|- style="text-align:center; background-color:#bbffbb"
| 35 || May 14 || Mariners || 6–1 || Lester (2–3) || Vargas (4–3) ||  || Fenway Park || 37,334 || 16–19 || W4
|-  style="text-align:center; background-color:#bbffbb"
| 36 || May 15 || Mariners || 5–0 || Beckett (3–4) || Beavan (1–4)  ||  || Fenway Park || 37,292  || 17–19 || W5
|-  style="text-align:center; background-color:#ffbbbb"
| 37 || May 16 || @ Rays || 1–2 || Hellickson (4–0) || Buchholz (4–2) || Rodney (12) || Tropicana Field || 20,843 || 17–20 || L1
|-  style="text-align:center; background-color:#bbffbb"
| 38 || May 17 || @ Rays || 5–3 || Doubront (4–1) || Moore (1–4) || Aceves (8) || Tropicana Field || 19,842 || 18–20 || W1
|-  style="text-align:center; background-color:#ffbbbb"
| 39 || May 18 || @ Phillies || 4–6 || Hamels (6–1) || Bard (3–5) || Papelbon (12) || Citizens Bank Park || 45,205 || 18–21 || L1 
|-  style="text-align:center; background-color:#bbffbb"
| 40 || May 19 || @ Phillies || 7–5 || Lester (3–3) || Blanton (4–4) || Aceves (9) || Citizens Bank Park || 45,656 || 19–21 || W1
|-  style="text-align:center; background-color:#bbffbb"
| 41 || May 20 || @ Phillies || 5–1 || Beckett (4–4) || Lee (0–2) || || Citizens Bank Park || 45,586 || 20–21 || W2
|-  style="text-align:center; background-color:#bbffbb"
| 42 || May 21 || @ Orioles || 8–6 || Miller (1–0) || Gregg (2–2) || Aceves (10) || Camden Yards || 16,392 || 21–21 || W3
|-  style="text-align:center; background-color:#ffbbbb"
| 43 || May 22 || @ Orioles || 1–4 || Matusz (4–4) || Doubront (4–2) || Johnson (16) || Camden Yards || 25,171 || 21–22 || L1
|-  style="text-align:center; background-color:#bbffbb"
| 44 || May 23 || @ Orioles || 6–5 || Bard (4–5) || Arrieta (2–5) || Aceves (11) || Camden Yards ||  27,806 || 22–22 || W1
|-  style="text-align:center; background-color:#ffbbbb"
| 45 || May 25 || Rays || 4–7 || Cobb (2–0) || Lester (3–4) || Rodney (15) || Fenway Park || 37,594 || 22–23 ||  L1
|-  style="text-align:center; background-color:#bbffbb"
| 46 || May 26 || Rays || 3–2 || Hill (1–0) || Rodney (2–1) ||  || Fenway Park || 38,099 || 23–23 || W1
|-  style="text-align:center; background-color:#ffbbbb"
| 47 || May 27 || Rays || 3–4 || McGee (2–1) || Aceves (0–2) || Rodney (16) || Fenway Park || 37,844 || 23–24 || L1
|-  style="text-align:center; background-color:#bbffbb"
| 48 || May 28 || Tigers || 7–4 || Doubront (5–2) || Fister (0–3) ||  || Fenway Park || 37,921 || 24–24 || W1 
|-  style="text-align:center; background-color:#bbffbb"
| 49 || May 29 || Tigers || 6–3 || Bard (5–5) || Verlander (5–3) || Aceves (12) || Fenway Park || 37,216 || 25–24 || W2
|-  style="text-align:center; background-color:#bbffbb"
| 50 || May 30 || Tigers || 6–4 || Albers (1–0) || Dotel (1–2) || Aceves (13) || Fenway Park || 37,195 || 26–24 || W3
|-  style="text-align:center; background-color:#ffbbbb"
| 51 || May 31 || Tigers || 3–7 || Scherzer (5–3) || Beckett (4–5) ||  || Fenway Park || 37,629 || 26–25 || L1
|-

|-  style="text-align:center; background-color:#bbffbb"
| 52 || June 1 || @ Blue Jays || 7–2 || Buchholz (5–2) || Álvarez (3–5) || || Rogers Centre || 29,678 || 27–25 || W1 
|-  style="text-align:center; background-color:#bbffbb"
| 53 || June 2 || @ Blue Jays || 7–4 || Doubront (6–2) || Drabek (4–6) || Aceves (14) || Rogers Centre || 43,390 || 28–25 || W2
|-  style="text-align:center; background-color:#ffbbbb"
| 54 || June 3 || @ Blue Jays || 1–5 || Hutchison (5–2) || Bard (5–6) || || Rogers Centre || 41,925 || 28–26 || L1
|-  style="text-align:center; background-color:#ffbbbb"
| 55 || June 5 || Orioles || 6–8 (10) || Johnson (1–0) || Aceves (0–3) || || Fenway Park || 37,181 || 28–27 || L2
|-  style="text-align:center; background-color:#ffbbbb"
| 56 || June 6 || Orioles || 1–2 || Chen (5–2) || Beckett (4–6) || Johnson (18) || Fenway Park || 37,243 || 28–28 || L3
|-  style="text-align:center; background-color:#bbffbb"
| 57 || June 7 || Orioles || 7–0 || Buchholz (6–2) || Matusz (5–6) ||  || Fenway Park || 37,307 || 29–28 || W1
|-  style="text-align:center; background-color:#ffbbbb"
| 58 || June 8 || Nationals || 4–7 || Strasburg (7–1) || Doubront (6–3) || Clippard (6) || Fenway Park || 37,309 || 29–29 || L1
|-  style="text-align:center; background-color:#ffbbbb"
| 59 || June 9 || Nationals || 2–4 || González (8–2) || Matsuzaka (0–1) || Clippard (7) || Fenway Park || 37,534 || 29–30 || L2 
|-  style="text-align:center; background-color:#ffbbbb"
| 60 || June 10 || Nationals || 3–4 || Gorzelanny (2–1) || Aceves (0–4) || Clippard (8) || Fenway Park || 37,467 || 29–31 || L3
|-  style="text-align:center; background-color:#ffbbbb"
| 61 || June 11 || @ Marlins || 1–4 || Johnson (4–4) || Beckett (4–7) || Bell (13) || Marlins Park || 32,562 || 29–32 || L4
|-  style="text-align:center; background-color:#bbffbb"
| 62 || June 12 || @ Marlins || 2–1 || Buchholz (7–2) || Buehrle (5–7) || Aceves (15) || Marlins Park || 29,326 || 30–32 || W1
|-  style="text-align:center; background-color:#bbffbb"
| 63 || June 13 || @ Marlins || 10–2 || Doubront (7–3) || Nolasco (6–5) || || Marlins Park || 33,119 || 31–32 || W2
|-  style="text-align:center; background-color:#ffbbbb"
| 64 || June 15 || @ Cubs || 0–3 || Dempster (3–3) || Matsuzaka (0–2) || Mármol (3) || Wrigley Field || 40,073 || 31–33 || L1
|-  style="text-align:center; background-color:#bbffbb"
| 65 || June 16 || @ Cubs || 4–3 || Lester (4–4) || Samardzija (5–5) || Aceves (16) || Wrigley Field || 40,766 || 32–33 || W1
|-  style="text-align:center; background-color:#bbffbb"
| 66 || June 17 || @ Cubs || 7–4 || Albers (2–0) || Camp (2–4) || || Wrigley Field || 38,531 || 33–33 || W2 
|-  style="text-align:center; background-color:#bbffbb"
| 67 || June 19 || Marlins || 7–5 || Buchholz (8–2) || Buehrle (5–8) || Aceves (17) || Fenway Park || 37,701 || 34–33 || W3
|-  style="text-align:center; background-color:#bbffbb"
| 68 || June 20 || Marlins || 15–5 || Doubront (8–3) || Nolasco (6–6) || || Fenway Park || 37,362 || 35–33 || W4
|-  style="text-align:center; background-color:#bbffbb"
| 69 || June 21 || Marlins || 6–5 || Atchison (2–0) || Mujica (0–3) || Aceves (18) || Fenway Park || 37,261 || 36–33 || W5
|-  style="text-align:center; background-color:#ffbbbb"
| 70 || June 22 || Braves || 1–4 || Jurrjens (1–2) || Lester (4–5) || Kimbrel (21) || Fenway Park || 37,281 || 36–34 || L1
|-  style="text-align:center; background-color:#bbffbb"
| 71 || June 23 || Braves || 8–4 || Morales (1–1) || Delgado (4–8) || || Fenway Park || 37,782 || 37–34 || W1
|-  style="text-align:center; background-color:#bbffbb"
| 72 || June 24 || Braves || 9–4 || Cook (1–1) || Minor (3–6) || || Fenway Park || 37,565 || 38–34 || W2
|-  style="text-align:center; background-color:#ffbbbb"
| 73 || June 25 || Blue Jays || 6–9 || Álvarez (4–6) || Doubront (8–4) || Janssen (8) || Fenway Park || 37,208 || 38–35 || L1
|-  style="text-align:center; background-color:#bbffbb"
| 74 || June 26 || Blue Jays || 5–1 || Miller (2–0) || Pérez (2–2) || || Fenway Park || 37,755 || 39–35 || W1
|-  style="text-align:center; background-color:#bbffbb"
| 75 || June 27 || Blue Jays || 10–4 || Lester (5–5) || Romero (8–2) || || Fenway Park || 37,744 || 40–35 || W2
|-  style="text-align:center; background-color:#ffbbbb"
| 76 || June 28 || @ Mariners || 0–1 || Hernández (6–5) || Atchison (2–1) || || Safeco Field || 20,692 || 40–36 || L1
|-  style="text-align:center; background-color:#bbffbb"
| 77 || June 29 || @ Mariners || 5–0 || Cook (2–1) || Noesí (2–10) || || Safeco Field || 23,094 || 41–36 || W1
|-  style="text-align:center; background-color:#ffbbbb"
| 78 || June 30 || @ Mariners || 2–3 (11) || Kelley (2–2) || Aceves (0–5) || || Safeco Field || 31,311 || 41–37 || L1
|-

|-  style="text-align:center; background-color:#bbffbb"
| 79 || July 1 || @ Mariners || 2–1 (10) || Padilla (2–0) || League (0–5) || Aceves (19) || Safeco Field || 34,065 || 42–37 || W1
|-  style="text-align:center; background-color:#ffbbbb"
| 80 || July 2 || @ Athletics || 1–6 || Parker (5–3) || Matsuzaka (0–3) ||  || O.co Coliseum || 17,434 || 42–38 || L1
|-  style="text-align:center; background-color:#ffbbbb"
| 81 || July 3 || @ Athletics || 2–3 || Blevins (2–0) || Aceves (0–6) || || O.co Coliseum || 35,067 || 42–39 || L2
|-  style="text-align:center; background-color:#ffbbbb"
| 82 || July 4 || @ Athletics || 2–3 || Balfour (2–2) || Cook (2–2) || Cook (8) || O.co Coliseum || 28,240 || 42–40 || L3
|-  style="text-align:center; background-color:#ffbbbb"
| 83 || July 6 || Yankees || 8–10 || Logan (4–0) || Miller (2–1) || Soriano (20) || Fenway Park || 38,066 || 42–41 || L4
|-  style="text-align:center; background-color:#ffbbbb"
| 84 || July 7 || Yankees || 1–6 || García (3–2)|| Morales (1–2) || || Fenway Park || 38,170 || 42–42 || L5
|-  style="text-align:center; background-color:#bbffbb"
| 85 || July 7 || Yankees || 9–5 || Doubront (9–4) || Hughes (9–7) || || Fenway Park || 37,791 || 43–42 || W1
|-  style="text-align:center; background-color:#ffbbbb"
| 86 || July 8 || Yankees || 3–7 || Nova (10–3) || Lester (5–6) ||  || Fenway Park || 38,270 || 43–43 || L1
|-  style="text-align:center; background:#bbcaff"
| colspan="2" | July 10 || All-Star Game || NL 8–0 AL  || Matt Cain  NL, (SF) || Justin Verlander AL, (DET) ||  || Kauffman Stadium || 40,933 || colspan="2" | Kansas City, MO
|-  style="text-align:center; background-color:#bbffbb"
| 87 || July 13 || @ Rays || 3–1 || Morales (2–2) || Hellickson (4–6) || Aceves (20) || Tropicana Field || 29,089 || 44–43 || W1
|-  style="text-align:center; background-color:#ffbbbb"
| 88 || July 14 || @ Rays || 3–5 || Price (12–4) || Buchholz (8–3) || Rodney (26) || Tropicana Field || 27,311 || 44–44 || L1
|-  style="text-align:center; background-color:#bbffbb"
| 89 || July 15 || @ Rays || 7–3 || Beckett (5–7) || Shields (8–6) ||  || Tropicana Field || 26,131 || 45–44 || W1
|-  style="text-align:center; background-color:#bbffbb"
| 90 || July 16 || White Sox || 5–1 || Padilla (3–0) || Séptimo (0–1) || || Fenway Park || 38,334 || 46–44 || W2
|-  style="text-align:center; background-color:#ffbbbb"
| 91 || July 17 || White Sox || 5–7 || Humber (4–4) || Lester (5–7) || Reed (15) || Fenway Park || 37,771 || 46–45 || L1
|-  style="text-align:center; background-color:#bbffbb"
| 92 || July 18 || White Sox || 10–1 || Doubront (10–4) || Hernández (0–1) || || Fenway Park || 37,367 || 47–45 || W1
|-  style="text-align:center; background-color:#bbffbb"
| 93 || July 19 || White Sox || 3–1 || Aceves (1–6) || Thornton (2–6) || || Fenway Park || 38,414 || 48–45 || W2
|-  style="text-align:center; background-color:#ffbbbb"
| 94 || July 20 || Blue Jays || 1–6 || Laffey (2–1) || Beckett (5–8) || || Fenway Park || 38,093 || 48–46 || L1
|-  style="text-align:center; background-color:#ffbbbb"
| 95 || July 21 || Blue Jays || 3–7 || Villanueva (5–0) || Cook (2–3) || || Fenway Park || 38,170 || 48–47 || L2
|-  style="text-align:center; background-color:#ffbbbb"
| 96 || July 22 || Blue Jays || 7–15 || Álvarez (6–7) || Lester (5–8) || || Fenway Park || 37,737 || 48–48 || L3
|-  style="text-align:center; background-color:#ffbbbb"
| 97 || July 23 || @ Rangers || 1–9 || Feldman (4–6) || Doubront (10–5) || || Rangers Ballpark || 44,132 || 48–49 || L4
|-  style="text-align:center; background-color:#bbffbb"
| 98 || July 24 || @ Rangers || 2–1 || Padilla (4–0) || Nathan (1–3) || Aceves (21) || Rangers Ballpark || 41,237 || 49–49 || W1
|-  style="text-align:center; background-color:#ffbbbb"
| 99 || July 25 || @ Rangers || 3–5 || Holland (7–5) || Beckett (5–9) || Nathan (20) || Rangers Ballpark || 44,104 || 49–50 || L1
|-  style="text-align:center; background-color:#ffbbbb"
| 100 || July 27 || @ Yankees || 3–10 || Hughes (10–8) || Cook (2–4) || || Yankee Stadium || 49,571 || 49–51 || L2
|-  style="text-align:center; background-color:#bbffbb"
| 101 || July 28 || @ Yankees || 8–6 || Miller (3–1) || Soriano (2–1) || Aceves (22) || Yankee Stadium || 49,573 || 50–51 || W1
|-  style="text-align:center; background-color:#bbffbb"
| 102 || July 29 || @ Yankees || 3–2 (10) || Aceves (2–6) || Robertson (1–4) ||  || Yankee Stadium || 48,526 || 51–51 || W2
|-  style="text-align:center; background-color:#bbffbb"
| 103 || July 30 || Tigers || 7–3 || Buchholz (9–3) || Scherzer (10–6) ||  || Fenway Park || 37,784 || 52–51 || W3
|-  style="text-align:center; background-color:#bbffbb"
| 104 || July 31 || Tigers || 4–1 (6) || Mortensen (1–0) || Verlander (11–7) || Morales (1) || Fenway Park || 37,275 || 53–51 || W4
|-

|-  style="text-align:center; background-color:#ffbbbb"
| 105 || August 1 || Tigers || 5–7 || Porcello (8–6) || Cook (2–5) || Valverde (21) || Fenway Park || 37,213 || 53–52 || L1
|-  style="text-align:center; background-color:#ffbbbb"
| 106 || August 2 || Twins || 0–5 || Deduno (3–0) || Lester (5–9) || Perkins (6) || Fenway Park || 37,191 || 53–53 || L2
|-  style="text-align:center; background-color:#ffbbbb"
| 107 || August 3 || Twins || 5–6 (10) || Gray (6–1) || Padilla (4–1)  || Burton (4) || Fenway Park || 37,285 || 53–54 || L3
|-  style="text-align:center; background-color:#ffbbbb"
| 108 || August 4 || Twins || 4–6 || Burnett (4–3) || Aceves (2–7) || Burton (5) || Fenway Park || 37,914 || 53–55 || L4
|-  style="text-align:center; background-color:#bbffbb"
| 109 || August 5 || Twins || 6–4 || Morales (3–2) || Blackburn (4–7) || Aceves (23) || Fenway Park || 37,019 || 54–55 || W1
|-  style="text-align:center; background-color:#bbffbb"
| 110 || August 6 || Rangers || 9–2 || Cook (3–5) || Darvish (11–8) ||  || Fenway Park || 37,316 || 55–55 || W2
|-  style="text-align:center; background-color:#ffbbbb"
| 111 || August 7 || Rangers || 3–6 || Dempster (6–5) || Lester (5–10) || Nathan (22) || Fenway Park || 38,416 || 55–56 || L1
|-  style="text-align:center; background-color:#ffbbbb"
| 112 || August 8 || Rangers || 9–10 || Ogando (2–0) || Mortensen (1–1) || Nathan (23) || Fenway Park || 37,716 || 55–57 || L2
|-  style="text-align:center; background-color:#ffbbbb"
| 113 || August 9 || @ Indians || 3–5 || Jiménez (9–11) || Doubront (10–6) || Perez (30) || Progressive Field || 19,639 || 55–58 || L3
|-  style="text-align:center; background-color:#bbffbb"
| 114 || August 10 || @ Indians || 3–2 || Buchholz (10–3) || Seddon (0–1) || || Progressive Field || 27,246 || 56–58 || W1
|-  style="text-align:center; background-color:#ffbbbb"
| 115 || August 11 || @ Indians || 2–5 || McAllister (5–4) || Morales (3–3) || Perez (31) || Progressive Field || 27,894 || 56–59 || L1
|-  style="text-align:center; background-color:#bbffbb"
| 116 || August 12 || @ Indians || 14–1 || Lester (6–10) || Kluber (0–1) || || Progressive Field || 27,488 || 57–59 || W1
|-  style="text-align:center; background-color:#ffbbbb"
| 117 || August 14 || @ Orioles || 1–7 || Chen (11–7) || Beckett (5–10) || || Camden Yards || 26,204 || 57–60 || L1
|-  style="text-align:center; background-color:#ffbbbb"
| 118 || August 15 || @ Orioles || 3–5 || González (5–2) || Cook (3–6) || Johnson (35) || Camden Yards || 22,269 || 57–61 || L2
|-  style="text-align:center; background-color:#bbffbb"
| 119 || August 16 || @ Orioles || 6–3 || Buchholz (11–3) || Ayala (4–4) || Aceves (24) || Camden Yards || 25,483 || 58–61 || W1
|-  style="text-align:center; background-color:#ffbbbb"
| 120 || August 17 || @ Yankees || 4–6 || Hughes (12–10) || Morales (3–4) || Soriano (30) || Yankee Stadium || 49,422 || 58–62 || L1
|-  style="text-align:center; background-color:#bbffbb"
| 121 || August 18 || @ Yankees || 4–1 || Lester (7–10) || Phelps (3–4) || Aceves (25) || Yankee Stadium || 49,466 || 59–62 || W1
|-  style="text-align:center; background-color:#ffbbbb"
| 122 || August 19 || @ Yankees || 1–4 || Kuroda (12–8) || Beckett (5–11) || Soriano (31) || Yankee Stadium || 48,620 || 59–63 || L1
|-  style="text-align:center; background-color:#ffbbbb"
| 123 || August 21 || Angels || 3–5 || Santana (7–10) || Cook (3–7) || Frieri (15) || Fenway Park || 37,794 || 59–64 || L2
|-  style="text-align:center; background-color:#ffbbbb"
| 124 || August 22 || Angels || 3–7 || Weaver (16–3) || Buchholz (11–4) || || Fenway Park || 37,373 || 59–65 || L3
|-  style="text-align:center; background-color:#ffbbbb"
| 125 || August 23 || Angels || 13–14 (10) || Frieri (3–0) || Aceves (2–8) || || Fenway Park || 37,829 || 59–66 || L4
|-  style="text-align:center; background-color:#bbffbb"
| 126 || August 24 || Royals || 4–3 || Lester (8–10) || Herrera (1–2) || Bailey (1) || Fenway Park || 37,228 || 60–66 || W1
|-  style="text-align:center; background-color:#ffbbbb"
| 127 || August 25 || Royals || 9–10 (12) || Bueno (1–0) || Tazawa (0–1) || Holland (7) || Fenway Park || 37,103 || 60–67 || L1
|-  style="text-align:center; background-color:#bbffbb"
| 128 || August 26 || Royals || 8–6 || Beato (1–0) || Smith (4–6) || Melancon (1) || Fenway Park || 37,188 || 61–67 || W1
|-  style="text-align:center; background-color:#bbffbb"
| 129 || August 27 || Royals || 5–1 || Matsuzaka (1–3) || Hochevar (7–12) || || Fenway Park || 37,506 || 62–67 || W2
|-  style="text-align:center; background-color:#ffbbbb"
| 130 || August 28 || @ Angels || 5–6 || Jepsen (3–2) || Aceves (2–9) || || Angel Stadium || 38,745 || 62–68 || L1
|-  style="text-align:center; background-color:#ffbbbb"
| 131 || August 29 || @ Angels || 3–10 || Wilson (10–9) || Stewart (1–3) || || Angel Stadium || 37,841 || 62–69 || L2
|-  style="text-align:center; background-color:#ffbbbb"
| 132 || August 30 || @ Angels || 2–5 || Greinke (12–5) || Lester (8–11) || Frieri (16) || Angel Stadium || 39,013 || 62–70 || L3
|-  style="text-align:center; background-color:#ffbbbb"
| 133 || August 31 || @ Athletics || 2–20 || McCarthy (8–5) || Cook (3–8) || || O.co Coliseum || 20,121 || 62–71 || L4
|-

|-  style="text-align:center; background-color:#ffbbbb"
| 134 || September 1 || @ Athletics || 1–7 || Griffin (4–0) || Doubront (10–7) ||  || O.co Coliseum || 20,315 || 62–72 || L5
|-  style="text-align:center; background-color:#ffbbbb"
| 135 || September 2 || @ Athletics || 2–6 || Anderson (3–0) || Matsuzaka (1–4) ||  || O.co Coliseum || 25,314 || 62–73 || L6
|-  style="text-align:center; background-color:#ffbbbb"
| 136 || September 3 || @ Mariners || 1–4 || Vargas (14–9) || Buchholz (11–5) || Wilhelmsen (23) || Safeco Field || 21,641 || 62–74 || L7
|-  style="text-align:center; background-color:#bbffbb"
| 137 || September 4 || @ Mariners || 4–3 || Lester (9–11) || Beavan (9–9) || Bailey (2) || Safeco Field || 12,754 || 63–74 || W1
|-  style="text-align:center; background-color:#ffbbbb"
| 138 || September 5 || @ Mariners || 1–2 || Millwood (5–12) || Cook (3–9) || Wilhelmsen (24) || Safeco Field || 13,037 || 63–75 || L1
|-  style="text-align:center; background-color:#ffbbbb"
| 139 || September 7 || Blue Jays || 5–7 || Álvarez (8–12) || Doubront (10–8) || || Fenway Park || 37,156 || 63–76 || L2
|-  style="text-align:center; background-color:#ffbbbb"
| 140 || September 8 || Blue Jays || 2–9 || Lincoln (5–2) || Matsuzaka (1–5) || || Fenway Park || 37,107 || 63–77 || L3
|-  style="text-align:center; background-color:#ffbbbb"
| 141 || September 9 || Blue Jays || 3–4 || Lyon (2–2)|| Buchholz (11–6) || Janssen (20) || Fenway Park || 37,226 || 63–78 || L4
|-  style="text-align:center; background-color:#bbffbb"
| 142 || September 11 || Yankees || 4–3 || Bailey (1–0) || Robertson (1–7) || || Fenway Park || 37,437 || 64–78 || W1
|-  style="text-align:center; background-color:#ffbbbb"
| 143 || September 12 || Yankees || 4–5 || Phelps (4–4) || Cook (3–10) || Soriano (37) || Fenway Park || 37,230 || 64–79 || L1
|-  style="text-align:center; background-color:#ffbbbb"
| 144 || September 13 || Yankees || 0–2 || Hughes (15–12) || Doubront (10–9) || Soriano (38) || Fenway Park || 38,134 || 64–80 || L2
|-  style="text-align:center; background-color:#bbffbb"
| 145 || September 14 || @ Blue Jays || 8–5 || Carpenter (1–0) || Oliver (3–3) || Bailey (3) || Rogers Centre || 21,888 || 65–80 || W1
|-  style="text-align:center; background-color:#bbffbb"
| 146 || September 15 || @ Blue Jays || 3–2 || Breslow (3–0) || Delabar (4–2) || Bailey (4) || Rogers Centre || 27,325 || 66–80 || W2
|-  style="text-align:center; background:#993333; color:white;"
| 147 || September 16 || @ Blue Jays || 0–5 || Lyon (3–2) || Lester (9–12) ||  || Rogers Centre || 21,698 || 66–81 || L1
|-  style="text-align:center; background-color:#bbffbb"
| 148 || September 17 || @ Rays || 5–2 || Cook (4–10) || Cobb (9–9) || || Tropicana Field || 11,722 || 67–81 || W1
|-  style="text-align:center; background-color:#bbffbb"
| 149 || September 18 || @ Rays || 7–5 || Doubront (11–9) || Farnsworth (1–6) || Bailey (5) || Tropicana Field || 11,502 || 68–81 || W2
|-  style="text-align:center; background-color:#ffbbbb"
| 150 || September 19 || @ Rays || 3–13 || Archer (1–3) || Matsuzaka (1–6) || || Tropicana Field || 12,708 || 68–82 || L1
|-  style="text-align:center; background-color:#ffbbbb"
| 151 || September 20 || @ Rays || 4–7 || Badenhop (2–2) || Bailey (1–1) || || Tropicana Field || 12,963 || 68–83 || L2
|-  style="text-align:center; background-color:#ffbbbb"
| 152 || September 21 || Orioles || 2–4 || González (7–4) || Lester (9–13) || Johnson (46) || Fenway Park || 37,731 || 68–84 || L3
|-  style="text-align:center; background-color:#ffbbbb"
| 153 || September 22 || Orioles || 6–9 (12) || Hunter (6–8) || Aceves (2–10) || Johnson (47) || Fenway Park || 37,570 || 68–85 || L4
|-  style="text-align:center; background-color:#bbffbb"
| 154 || September 23 || Orioles || 2–1 || Tazawa (1–1) || Ayala (5–5) || Bailey (6) || Fenway Park || 37,310 || 69–85 || W1
|-  style="text-align:center; background-color:#ffbbbb"
| 155 || September 25 || Rays || 2–5 || Price (19–5) || Buchholz (11–7) || || Fenway Park || 37,045 || 69–86 || L1
|-  style="text-align:center; background-color:#ffbbbb"
| 156 || September 26 || Rays || 2–4 || Cobb (10–9) || Lester (9–14) || Rodney (45) || Fenway Park || 37,247 || 69–87 || L2
|-  style="text-align:center; background-color:#ffbbbb"
| 157 || September 28 || @ Orioles || 1–9 || Tillman (9–2) || Cook (4–11) ||  || Camden Yards || 33,518 || 69–88 || L3
|-  style="text-align:center; background-color:#ffbbbb"
| 158 || September 29 || @ Orioles || 3–4 || Hunter (7–8) || Doubront (11–10) || Johnson (49) || Camden Yards || 46,311 || 69–89 || L4
|-  style="text-align:center; background-color:#ffbbbb"
| 159 || September 30 || @ Orioles || 3–6 || Saunders (9–13) || Stewart (1–4) || Johnson (50) || Camden Yards || 41,257 || 69–90 || L5
|-  style="text-align:center; background-color:#ffbbbb"
| 160 || October 1 || @ Yankees || 2–10 || Sabathia (15–6) || Buchholz (11–8) ||  || Yankee Stadium || 45,478 || 69–91 || L6
|-  style="text-align:center; background-color:#ffbbbb"
| 161 || October 2 || @ Yankees || 3–4 (12) || Lowe (9–11) || Miller (3–2) ||  || Yankee Stadium || 41,564 || 69–92 || L7
|-  style="text-align:center; background-color:#ffbbbb"
| 162 || October 3 || @ Yankees || 2–14 || Kuroda (16–11) || Matsuzaka (1–7) ||  || Yankee Stadium || 47,393 || 69–93 || L8
|-

Season standings

American League East

American League Wild Card

Record vs. opponents

Awards and honors
 Adrián González – AL Player of the Week (July 16–22, August 6–12)
 Will Middlebrooks – AL Player of the Week (June 18–24)
 Andrew Miller – Boston Red Sox Fireman of the Year

All-Star Game
 David Ortiz, starting DH

Farm system

Source:

LEAGUE CHAMPIONS: Pawtucket

References

External links
2012 Boston Red Sox season at Baseball Reference
2012 Boston Red Sox Media Guide
2012 Boston Red Sox Draft Selections

Boston Red Sox seasons
Boston Red Sox
Boston Red
Red Sox